San Fernando Gardens is a housing project located in the Pacoima district of the San Fernando Valley region of Los Angeles, California.

San Fernando Gardens was built in 1955, with a low-rise, garden apartment design. The project was racially integrated; Like the district surrounding it, San Fernando Gardens is now overwhelmingly Latino and African American. It is the northernmost project in Housing Authority of the City of Los Angeles's system.

Education 
The facility is assigned to the following Los Angeles Unified School District schools:
 Pacoima Elementary School
 Maclay Middle School
 San Fernando High School

References 

Public housing in Los Angeles
Buildings and structures in the San Fernando Valley
Pacoima, Los Angeles